Brasileirinho is a 2005 musical documentary film by Finnish film director Mika Kaurismäki about traditional Brazilian choro music genre. The film showed at the 2005 Berlin International Film Festival.
It is titled after the 1947 song, Brasileirinho.

Notes

References

External links 
 Official website
 

Choro
Documentary films about music and musicians
Films directed by Mika Kaurismäki
2005 films
2005 documentary films
Finnish musical films
Finnish documentary films
Brazilian music
Swiss musical films
Swiss documentary films